In Greek mythology, Androthoe (Ancient Greek: Ἀνδροθόη) was the daughter of Pericastor and wife of Peristhenes, son of Damastor. By the latter she became the mother of the fisherman Dictys and Polydectes, king of Seriphos. Otherwise, these two sons were called the children of Magnes and an unnamed naiad or of Poseidon and Cerebia.

Notes

References 

 Apollodorus, The Library with an English Translation by Sir James George Frazer, F.B.A., F.R.S. in 2 Volumes, Cambridge, MA, Harvard University Press; London, William Heinemann Ltd. 1921. ISBN 0-674-99135-4. Online version at the Perseus Digital Library. Greek text available from the same website.
Gantz, Timothy, Early Greek Myth: A Guide to Literary and Artistic Sources, Johns Hopkins University Press, 1996, Two volumes:  (Vol. 1),  (Vol. 2).

Women in Greek mythology
Characters in Greek mythology